James Harold Davenport (born 26 September 1953) is a British computer scientist who works in computer algebra. Having done his PhD and early research at the Computer Laboratory, University of Cambridge, he is the Hebron and Medlock Professor of Information Technology at the University of Bath in Bath, England.

Education
Davenport was educated at Marlborough College, and was then a student at Trinity College, Cambridge. He was awarded a Bachelor of Arts degree in 1974 which was converted to a Master of Arts degree in 1978. He was awarded a PhD in 1980.

Career and research
In 1969, the team that developed the automated teller machine in the United Kingdom at IBM Hursley used parts from that project to build an IBM School Computer. It was a community outreach project, and it went on tour. When it came to Marlborough College, Davenport, aged 16, discovered that, although it was ostensibly a six-digit computer, the microcode had access to a 12-digit internal register to do multiply/divide. He used this to implement Draim's algorithm from his father's book, The Higher Arithmetic, and tested eight-digit numbers for primality.

Between school and university, Davenport worked in a government laboratory for nine months, again writing and using multiword arithmetic, but also using number theory to solve a problem in hashing, which was published. He was at IBM Yorktown Heights for a year, and returned to Cambridge as a Research Fellow. He went to Grenoble for a year, before taking a post at the University of Bath in 1983.

Davenport is an author of a textbook about computer algebra and of many papers. He has been Project Chair of the European OpenMath Project and its successor Thematic Network, with responsibilities for aligning OpenMath and MathML, producing Content Dictionaries and supervised a Reduce-based OpenMath/MathML translator, and was Treasurer of the European Mathematical Trust. He was Founding Editor-in-Chief of the London Mathematical Society's Journal of Computation and Mathematics.

Awards and honours
Davenport was awarded the Honorary Degree of Doctor of Science in September 2019 by the  West University of Timişoara, Romania.  This was in recognition of his pioneering and ongoing work in computer algebra systems and theory of symbolic computation.

In 2014, Davenport was awarded a National Teaching Fellowship by the Higher Education Academy.

He was awarded the Bronze Medal of the University of Helsinki in 2001.

From January to June 2017 Davenport was a Fulbright CyberSecurity Scholar at New York University, and maintained a blog over the same period.

Personal life
Davenport is the son of the mathematician Harold Davenport.

References

British computer scientists
Alumni of Trinity College, Cambridge
Academics of the University of Bath
Living people
1953 births